South City is a  condominium in Kolkata, India. It is situated at Prince Anwar Shah Road in Jadavpur. It is also close to the Jodhpur Park and Tollygunge areas of the city. Most of the recent real estate development in Kolkata has taken place in the E.M. Bypass area and Greater Kolkata (Salt Lake, New Town etc.). However, the South City complex is in the heart of the city.

The condominium features a residential complex, which includes a number of recreational facilities, a school, an infirmary, a shopping mall and a social club.

The residential complex is a condominium and has 5 residential towers – 4 towers of 35 floors and 1 tower of 15 floors. Once the tallest residential towers in the city, as of 2013, the 35-story buildings are presently the second tallest buildings in Eastern India. The first, second, third and fourth tower are named Oak, Pine, Maple and Cedar, respectively. There is also a rain water harvesting system in the complex. There are around 1,700 families living in the complex.

The South City Mall located just outside the complex is one of the biggest and most popular malls in Eastern India.

The South City International School situated adjacent to the complex premises is affiliated with the Board of Indian School Certificate Examinations and as well as an International Board.

The South City Club has one of the largest swimming pools in Kolkata, as well as facilities for badminton, table tennis, lawn tennis, and billiards, and a library, gym, guest rooms, and a massage centre.

See also
 List of tallest buildings in Kolkata
 List of tallest buildings in India
 List of tallest buildings and structures in the Indian subcontinent
 South City Mall

References

External links
 

Buildings and structures in Kolkata
2004 establishments in West Bengal
Buildings and structures completed in 2012